Hugh King (born 1845, date of death unknown) was a United States Navy sailor and a recipient of the United States military's highest decoration, the Medal of Honor.

A native of Ireland, King immigrated to the United States and joined the Navy from New York in July 1871. On that day, while Iroquois was in the Delaware River, he jumped overboard and rescued a shipmate from drowning. For this action, he was awarded the Medal of Honor ten months later, on July 9, 1872.

King's official Medal of Honor citation reads:
On board the U.S.S. Iroquois, Delaware River, 7 September 1871. Jumping overboard at the imminent risk of his life, King rescued one of the crew of that vessel from drowning.

See also

List of Medal of Honor recipients during peacetime

References

External links

1845 births
Year of death missing
Irish emigrants to the United States (before 1923)
United States Navy sailors
United States Navy Medal of Honor recipients
Irish-born Medal of Honor recipients
Irish sailors in the United States Navy
Non-combat recipients of the Medal of Honor